La Plata Peak is the fifth-highest summit of the Rocky Mountains of North America and the U.S. state of Colorado.

"La Plata" is Spanish for "The Silver", a reference to the many silver deposits in the area.  The nearby ghost towns of Winfield and Hamilton were prominent silver mining towns in the early part of the 20th century.  A Hayden Survey team first climbed the peak on July 26, 1873.

The elevation of 14,361 feet marked on the USGS Mount Elbert Quadrangle is incorrect, and should read 14,336 feet (in the NGVD 29 vertical datum).

Climbing Routes 

Northwest Ridge: This is the standard route used to climb the mountain. like most Sawatch range 14ers it is non-technical, but incredibly steep. The trail is 9.5 miles round trip, with 4,500 feet of elevation gain and class 2 hiking along the ridge.

Ellingwood Ridge: Ellingwood Ridge is one of the most technically difficult alternate routes in the Sawatch range. it was first climbed by Albert Ellingwood in the 1930s. It is rated as class 3, but the extremely difficult route finding and length of the climb make this a very challenging endeavor. Much of the climbing is off trail. The climb is 9.5 miles round trip, with 5,900 feet of elevation gain.

See also

List of mountain peaks of North America
List of mountain peaks of the United States
List of mountain peaks of Colorado
List of Colorado fourteeners

Notes

References

External links

 
 
 

Mountains of Colorado
Mountains of Chaffee County, Colorado
Fourteeners of Colorado
San Isabel National Forest
North American 4000 m summits